Fast Eddie or Fast Eddy may refer to:

People
Eddie Clarke (1950–2018), English guitarist and former member of Motörhead
Edward Davenport (fraudster) (born 1966), convicted English fraudster
Edward Dostaler, Canadian charity runner
Paul Edmondson (enduro rider) (born 1969), British enduro rider
Eddie Hoh (1944–2015), American studio session and touring drummer
Eddie Johnson (1955–2020), American basketball player
Eddie Lampert (born 1962), former CEO of Sears Holdings.
Eddie Parker (pool player) (c. 1932–2001), American pool player, believed by many to have been the inspiration for the character "Fast Eddie" Felson (see Other uses section below)
Eddie Rickenbacker (1890-1973), American World War I fighter ace and Medal of Honor recipient
Ed Rendell (born 1944), former Mayor of Philadelphia and former Governor of Pennsylvania
Ed Savitz (1942-1993), American businessman and pedophile
Eddie Smith (pitcher) (1913-1994), American Major League Baseball pitcher
Fast Eddie (producer), American house-music producer Edwin A. Smith
Edward Vrdolyak (born 1937), American politician
FastEddie, pseudonym of the founder of the TV Tropes website
Edward Lafferty a well known busker from Dundee

Other uses
Fast Eddie Felson, protagonist of the novel The Hustler, the film The Hustler and its sequel, The Color of Money
Fast Eddie Costigan, pianist and bouncer in Spider Robinson's "Callahan's" stories such as Callahan's Crosstime Saloon
Fast Eddies a Canadian fast food chain
Fast Eddys, an Australian fast food chain
Adobe Photoshop version 2.0, released in June 1991 and codenamed Fast Eddy
Fast Eddie (video game), a game for the Atari 2600 by Sirius Software